Ian Appelbaum is an American physicist, currently at the University of Maryland and an Elected Fellow of the American Physical Society. He is a graduate of Massachusetts Institute of Technology with a Ph.D. in physics.

References

External links

Living people
MIT Department of Physics alumni
Fellows of the American Physical Society
21st-century American physicists
Year of birth missing (living people)
Place of birth missing (living people)